Roland "Schoolboy" Anderson was an American baseball pitcher and outfielder in the Negro leagues. He played with the Philadelphia Black Meteors, the Otto Briggs All Stars, and the Homestead Grays.


Career
From the team's inception in 1933, Anderson appears to have been a key component in the Meteors' success, eventually leading to an ultimately unsuccessful bid to acquire him by the 1934 Negro NL champion Philadelphia Stars. In July 1936, the Philadelphia Tribune reported:
The Stars are after Saddler of the Briggs Meteors and "Schoolboy" Anderson. But the newly elected associate Otto Briggs has told Webster McDonald to lay hands off, they're his boys.
Moreover, the value assigned Philadelphia's "schoolboy twirler" did not derive solely from his mound exploits, as evidenced by a number of contemporaneous news items (including one featuring what may well be the only published photograph of Anderson), documenting not merely some degree of batting prowess, but also the fact that, in at least a handful of Meteors games, he started in either right, left or center field.

Notes

References

External links
 and Baseball-Reference Black Baseball Stats and  Seamheads 
 United States Social Security Death Index at FamilySearch
 Mattie B Small Anderson, United States, GenealogyBank Obituaries, 1980-2014 at FamilySearch

Homestead Grays players
Baseball players from Philadelphia
Year of birth missing
Year of death missing
Baseball pitchers
Baseball outfielders